Dmitry Grigoriyevich Bogrov ( – ) was the assassin of Prime Minister Pyotr Stolypin.

On  Bogrow was sentenced to death by hanging.

Stolypin's widow had campaigned in vain to spare the assassin's young life. The investigations into the background of the assassination extended over a year. Through the intervention of Nicholas II, further investigations were prohibited. According to Egor Lazarev, Bogrov claimed to have committed the assassination in revenge for the antisemitism of the Russian Empire which he personally endured. However, his true motives for the assassination remain disputed as he was both a member of the Socialist Revolutionary Party and an informant for the Okhrana.

References

1887 births
1911 deaths
Anarchist assassins
Assassins of heads of government
Executed assassins
Executed Ukrainian people
Jewish anarchists
Okhrana informants
People convicted of murder by Russia
People executed by the Russian Empire
People executed by the Russian Empire by hanging
People from Kiev Governorate
People from Kyiv
Ukrainian anarchists
Ukrainian assassins
Ukrainian Jews
Ukrainian people convicted of murder
Ukrainian revolutionaries

Executed anarchists